Ndok Gjeloshi (15 November 1893 – 11 April 1943) was an Albanian army officer and Militia commander during World War II.

Life
Gjeloshi was born in Mekshaj, Shalë municipality of Dukagjin region in North Albania. He studied in the Franciscan College in Shkodër, and after that finished the Military Academy of Modena.

Gjeloshi supported Prince Wied during his short reign of the Principality of Albania, and like many other pro-Wied nationalists he was a member of the short-lived "Albanian Nationalist Party".

Supporter of Fan Noli's political ideas, he was an active participant of the June Revolution, and was promoted "Captain" of the border guard. After Ahmet Zogu's return from Yugoslavia, he fled the country and went in exile.

In 1926, together with Loro Caka, a Catholic priest, Gjeloshi organized a rebellion in Dukagjin. The rebellion could not spread in nearby regions; it remained isolated and was quelled by Zogist forces. Gjeoloshi fled again. He joined the Albanian political émigré in Vienna, Austria and became member of the "National Union", an organization of anti-Zog activists in exile, which was formed in 1925 in Vienna with the initiative of Ali Kelcyra, Angjelin Suma, Xhemal Bushati, and Sejfi Vllamasi.

Zog's assassination attempt

In 1931, he was arrested along with Aziz Çami for an assassination attempt against King Zog I. According to Gjeloshi memories' he studied very well the scene before the assassination attempt occurred. His memories contrast with the official version given later that state the Zogu fired back and Topallaj (got killed by Gjeloshi) hurried to cover Zogu with his body.

He was sentenced to 3 years and 6 months by the court, together with Çami (2 years and 6 month). The other organizers, between them Qazim Mulleti, Mustafa Merlika-Kruja, Rexhep Mitrovica, Angjelin Suma, Sejfi Vllamasi, etc. were released soon after their arrest. They were expelled from Austria and most of them moved to Paris. Gjeloshi would remain in Prague after the release.

Return to Albania

Gjeloshi returned to Albania after King Zog's exile during the Italian invasion of Albania. Because of his nationalistic ideas, considering that Kosovo and other regions joined the new Albanian state, he joined the local militia with the rank of Major. He was assassinated in Spring 1943 by a communist activist, Myslym Keta, in one of the main streets of Tirana.

References

External links
www.shkoder.net

Shala (tribe)
Assassinated Albanian people
1943 deaths
Albanian collaborators with Fascist Italy
Military education and training in Italy
Albanian nationalists
Balli Kombëtar
1893 births
20th-century Albanian military personnel
Albanians from the Ottoman Empire
Albanian emigrants to Austria
Albanian anti-communists
Albanian Roman Catholics
Assassins